Watchers 3 is the 1994 sequel to the 1988 horror film Watchers directed by Jeremy Stanford. Starring Wings Hauser, the film is loosely based on the 1987 novel Watchers by Dean Koontz. Produced by Roger Corman, Watchers 3 was shot entirely on location in Peru.

Plot
A top secret experiment spawns two highly intelligent life-forms: Einstein, a golden retriever with an IQ of 175; and the Outsider, a deformed monstrosity that exists to kill and to avenge its creators. When the Outsider escapes into the jungles of South America, the government sends in Ferguson and some ex-military convicts to catch the beast. But what starts out as a high-speed chase ends in carnage. Only Einstein knows the Outsider's motives, and only the canine can outsmart the creature.

Release
This sequel did not receive the benefit of a theatrical release as the original did. Instead, the film went straight-to-video. The film was released on a DVD by New Concorde Home Entertainment in 2003. The film is notable in that many reviewers remarked how the plot copied the Arnold Schwarzenegger film Predator.

References

External links

American monster movies
1994 films
1994 horror films
Films based on works by Dean Koontz
Direct-to-video horror films
Watchers (film series)
1990s English-language films
1990s American films